John "Edward" Horner Chancellor (born December 1962), is a British financial historian, finance journalist, and former investment strategist. In 2016, the Financial Analysts Journal called him "one of the great financial writers of our era", and in 2022, Fortune called him "one of the greatest financial historians alive". Chancellor is noted for his prescient warnings of the last three major economic bubbles in his published works: Devil Take the Hindmost: A History of Financial Speculation (1999, the dot-com bubble), Crunch-Time for Credit? (2005, the credit bubble), and The Price of Time: The Real Story of Interest (2022, the everything bubble).

Early life and education
Chancellor was born in Richmond, England to barrister John Paget Chancellor (the editor of Knowledge), the eldest son of Sir Christopher Chancellor and Mary Jolliffe, who was the daughter of Lord Hylton. The Chancellor family were Scottish gentry who owned land at Quothquan since 1432.  His sister is the actress Anna Chancellor.

He graduated from Trinity College, Cambridge with first class honors in Modern History, and later from St Antony's College, Oxford with a Masters of Philosophy in Modern History.

Investment career
After graduation, Chancellor worked for the investment bank Lazard Brothers in mergers & acquisitions from the early 1990s, and from 2008 to 2014, he was a senior member of the asset allocation team, and of the capital markets research team, at the Boston investment firm Grantham, Mayo, van Otterloo & Co. (GMO).

Writing career

Author

In 1999, Chancellor published Devil Take the Hindmost: A History of Financial Speculation, which made the long-list of the New York Times Notable Book of the Year. Martin Vander Weyer in the Spectator called the book a much more entertaining version of Charles P. Kindleberger's 1978 work Manias, Panics and Crashes. 

In 2022, William J. Bernstein said of the book, "More than 20 years ago, Edward Chancellor's Devil Take the Hindmost supplied readers with one of the most engaging and incisive descriptions of financial manias ever written". Bernstein added, "Besides being a first-rate economic historian, Chancellor is also a master wordsmith; almost unique among serious finance books".

In 2005, he published Crunch Time for Credit?, an analysis of the credit boom in the United States and the United Kingdom. The book came from a 2005 report Chancellor wrote for British hedge fund manager Crispin Odey on the growing housing and credit bubble. In 2009, Charles Moore wrote of the book, "Chancellor foresaw almost everything. His report listed the common features of the US and British credit booms, including 'a shared belief in the new paradigm and the ability of central bankers to save the day', 'low-income growth yet also strong growth in consumer spending, largely fuelled by home equity withdrawal' and 'rising government deficits.'"

In 2022, he published The Price of Time: The Real Story of Interest, which criticized the orthodox central banking policy of continually lowering interest rates, and using perpetual quantitative easing, to generate economic growth via asset price inflation. A policy that Chancellor predicted had resulted in an everything bubble in asset prices, extreme wealth inequality (particularly between the generations), and that would end in very high levels of price inflation. 

Martin Wolf in the Financial Times described the book as "a polemic against everything [Ben] Bernanke stands for" when reviewing it alongside former Fed chair Ben Bernanke's own 2022 book, 21st Century Monetary Policy. Martin Vander Weyer praised the book describing it as a more engaging read on the subject area than Thomas Piketty's Capital in the Twenty-First Century.  Emma Duncan in the Sunday Times praised the book and said Chancellor had a "gift for timing", as his two earlier books had forewarned of bubbles in speculation – the dot-com bubble, and the credit bubble – that eventually burst.  Finance author Felix Martin called the book a "timely warning" of central bank folly, and given the prescient nature of Chancellor's previous two books, said that as well as buying the book, investors should "sell all your stocks".  In August 2022, the book was added to the list for the Financial Times Business Book of the Year Award for 2022.

Journalist

During and after his period as a full-time investment manager, Chancellor has also provided opinion pieces and articles for the Reuters financial commentary website Breakingviews, and the Institutional Investor.  He has also contributed opinion pieces to other financial publications, including the Wall Street Journal, MoneyWeek, the New York Review of Books, and the Financial Times.

In 2008, Chancellor was announced as the winner of the 2007 George Polk Award in Financial Reporting for his 2007 article Ponzi Nation that he wrote for Institutional Investor.  His citation noted that Chancellor had "warned months before the market decline that excessive risk-taking and interconnected investments – fueled by subprime mortgages and the activities of lightly regulated hedge funds – could cause calamity for world economies".  He was the first-ever writer for Institutional Investor to win a George Polk Award.

During the run-up to the 2016 Brexit referendum, Chancellor wrote in his columns about why he had decided to vote to leave saying that the "European project has morphed from Kant's ideal of an international federation into something akin to the late Habsburg Empire".

Awards
 2007 George Polk Award – Financial Reporting, for his Ponzi Nation article in Institutional Investor.

Notable works

As author

As editor
Chancellor edited two anthologies of investment reports from Marathon Asset Management:

As journalist

, for which Chancellor won the 2007 George Polk Award in Financial Reporting.

See also
Asquith family
Everything bubble
Greenspan put

References

External links
Edward Chancellor: Asset Allocation Insights, Seeking Alpha (2009)
Edward Chancellor: History of the Gold Standard, C-SPAN (2012)
Edward Chancellor: 'intelligent contrarians' should follow the capital cycle, Merryn Somerset Webb MoneyWeek (2015)

1962 births
Living people
People from Richmond, London
Asquith family
Alumni of Trinity College, Cambridge
Alumni of St Antony's College, Oxford
English financial analysts
English investment bankers
English money managers
Economic historians
Historians of economic thought
English male journalists
English financial writers
British business and financial journalists
English columnists
English essayists
21st-century English non-fiction writers
20th-century English non-fiction writers
English male non-fiction writers
Reuters people
George Polk Award recipients
Monetary reformers